Yaguará is a town and municipality in the Huila Department, Colombia. The municipality borders Teruel and Palermo in the north, Gigante, Hobo and Tesalia in the south, Campoalegre and Hobo in the east and Tesalia and Iquira in the west. The Betania Reservoir is situated within the boundaries of Yaguará.

Etymology 
The name Yaguará is derived from the jaguar.

History 
In the time before the Spanish conquest, the region of Yaguará was inhabited by the Páez. They defended their territory against the Pijao, who came from nearby Tolima and later against the Spanish conquistadors.

Modern Yaguará was founded on March 13, 1623 by Francisco Gómez Quintero, under command of the governor of Neiva Diego de Ospina y Medinilla.

Paleontology 
Fossils of the Late Cretaceous (Turonian) mosasaur Yaguarasaurus were found in the La Frontera Formation in Yaguará and the species was named after the town.

Gallery

References 

Municipalities of Huila Department
Populated places on the Magdalena River
Populated places established in 1623
1623 establishments in the Spanish Empire